Scuderia Famà is an auto racing team based in Italy.

History

Single-seaters

References

External links
Official Website

Italian auto racing teams
International Formula Masters teams
Auto GP teams
Italian Formula 3 teams
Auto racing teams established in 1985